Mama (Мама, sometimes translated Mother or Mom) is a Russian album by Vitas. It was released in October 3rd, 2003. Songs from this album featured heavily in the setlist of Vitas' extensive world tour Songs of My Mother (Песни моей мамы), premiered at the State Central Concert Hall "Rossiya" in November 1st and 2nd, 2003, and performed at hundreds of venues in several countries from 2004 to 2006.

The opening track, The Star (Звезда) won a Russian People's HIT prize in 2003 and is one of Vitas' most popular songs worldwide. Like Opera No. 2 (Опера №2), it is still a staple of Vitas' live performances. Vitas sang the song as a duet with Alexander Kireev for his entry into the Star Factory in 2006.

He performed the song Starry River (Звёздная река) accompanied by its composer Aleksandra Pakhmutova on piano at a concert in honour of the composer.

He covered the song The Unknown Friend Song (Песня о неизвестном друге, also known as Extraterrestrial Friend) composed in 1985 by Aleksandra Pakhmutova and Rasul Gamzatov (the poem is translated by Yunna Morits) for the song cycle The Earth Globe (Шар земной, 1985–1987). The song is about an unknown friend that realizes that there is an unknown circle of "invisible and unknown" friends and enemies, as well as "lovable planets" (as per the lyrics), in addition to interstellar and general awareness, brotherhood to the next and an existence of an extraplanetary cycle. (The song addresses the topic of science fiction: brotherhood for humanity in the 3rd millennium and beyond.) It is also subsequently re-edited on Vitas' 2006 CD Return Home. There's also the music score of the song (available on the composer's website) to download. In concert, Vitas often donned an alien robot costume while performing this song.

Track listing

Personnel 
Credits adapted from the original CD's liner notes.

 Sergey Pudovkin – executive producer
 Mikhail Dobrotvorskiy – management
 Dmitriy Dobrotvorskiy – direction
 Eduard Izmestyev – production, arrangement
 Mikhail Grishin – engineering
 Ilya Grebenyuk – keyboards
 Aleksandr Gruzdev – guitar, saxophone
 Rashit Kiyamov – bass guitar
 Rushan Kharryasov – drums, percussion
 Oboz Design Studio – sleeve design

References

External links
 Official site
 Vitas on Facebook
 Vitas' producer on Facebook
 Amazon reviews
 English translations of lyrics

2003 albums
Vitas albums